Marija Mićović (Serbian Cyrillic: Мaриja Мићовић; born October 1, 1982, in Belgrade, SFR Yugoslavia) is a Serbian female basketball player.

External links
Profile at eurobasket.com

1982 births
Living people
Basketball players from Belgrade
Serbian women's basketball players
Power forwards (basketball)
Small forwards